is an annual reference mook series published by Takarajimasha since 2005 featuring yearly rankings and reviews of manga. The rankings are compiled by surveying people in the manga and publishing industry. The series is part of Takarajimasha's other mook series, including Kono Eiga ga Sugoi!, which focuses on film; Kono Mystery ga Sugoi!, which focuses on mystery novels; and Kono Light Novel ga Sugoi!, which focuses on light novels.

Publications
 Kono Manga ga Sugoi! 2006 Men ver. (December 1, 2005)
 Kono Manga ga Sugoi! 2006 Women ver. (December 1, 2005)
 Kono Manga ga Sugoi! 2007 Men ver. (December 5, 2006)
 Kono Manga ga Sugoi! 2007 Women ver. (December 5, 2006)
 Kono Manga ga Sugoi! 2008 (December 4, 2007)
 Kono Manga ga Sugoi! Side B (August 8, 2008)
 Kono Manga ga Sugoi! 2009 (December 5, 2008)
 Kono Manga ga Sugoi! 2010 (December 10, 2009)
 Kono Manga ga Sugoi! 2011 (December 10, 2010)
 Kono Manga ga Sugoi! 2012 (December 10, 2011)
 Kono Manga ga Sugoi! 2013 (December 10, 2012)
 Kono Manga ga Sugoi! 2014 (December 9, 2013)
 Kono Manga ga Sugoi! 2015 (December 10, 2014)
 Kono Manga ga Sugoi! 2016 (December 10, 2015)
 Kono Manga ga Sugoi! 2017 (December 10, 2016)
 Kono Manga ga Sugoi! 2018 (December 9, 2017)
 Kono Manga ga Sugoi! 2019 (December 11, 2018)
 Kono Manga ga Sugoi! 2020 (December 11, 2019)
 Kono Manga ga Sugoi! 2021 (December 14, 2020)
 Kono Manga ga Sugoi! 2022 (December 9, 2021)
 Kono Manga ga Sugoi! 2023 (December 14, 2022)

Top ranking manga of the year

References

External links
  

Manga
Publications established in 2005